I Had a Dream may  refer to:
 I Had a Dream (John Sebastian song)
 I Had A Dream (Johnnie Taylor song)
 I Had a Dream (Kelly Clarkson song)
 I Had a Dream (Paul Revere & the Raiders song)
 I Had a Dream, Joe
 I Had a Dream That You Were Mine

See also
 I Have a Dream (disambiguation)